Institute of the Pacific United is a Japanese and New Zealand tertiary educational institution based in Palmerston North, New Zealand. Another network of the institute is International Pacific University, which was established in 2007 in Okayama, Japan. Students of IPU New Zealand are from 24 different countries around the world.

IPU New Zealand mainly offers tertiary education of business (including accounting, finance, marketing and management), international relations, linguistics, environmental studies and tourism.

Despite the fact that the institution had been known as International Pacific College (IPC) for 25 years, its name was officially changed to Institute of the Pacific United (IPU New Zealand) on 26 September 2015.

Partner universities 
  International Pacific University
  Foreign Trade University
  President University
  Qingdao University of Science and Technology
  Vladivostok State University of Economics and Service
  Tajik State University of Commerce
  Rangsit University
  Samarkand State University

Academic programmes

Diploma programmes 
 Diploma of Japanese Studies 
 Graduate Diploma of International Studies – Level 7 
 The Licentiate Diploma and Certificate in TESOL (Trinity College London)

Bachelor of Contemporary international studies programmes 
 Bachelor of International Business
 Bachelor of International Relations
 Bachelor of TESOL
 Bachelor of Japanese Studies

Postgraduate programmes 
 Master of International Studies (MIS) – Level 9 
 Postgraduate Diploma of International Studies – Level 8

Foundation education 
 English language courses 
 IELTS 
 TOEIC

Admission

For domestic students 
IPU requires students from New Zealand to gain different levels of University Entrance through NCEA to enter different programmes offered by them.

For international students 
International students are required to take Foundation Education and English Programmes if they do not gain particular qualifications below:
 Minimum IELTS Academic score of 6.0 to enter Undergraduate Programmes 
  Minimum IELTS Academic score of 6.5 to enter Postgraduate Programmes

Campus and facilities 
Unlike other Manawatu-regional campuses such as Massey University and Universal College of Learning, IPU is built with the style of Japanese architecture with 20.5 hectare campus with 12 main buildings, located at Aokautere Drive, Palmerston North.

Main buildings
 Administration/Reception
 Computer Network
 Dining Hall
 Library
 Residential Services
 Recreation Centre 
Weights Room
 Teaching Blocks
 KAN Performing Arts Centre
 IT Support	
Seminar Blocks
 Building A
 Building B
 Building C
 Building D
 Building T

Accommodation

Halls of residence 
Single-room hostels: Hall 1,  Hall 2,  Hall 3,  Hall 4,  Hall 5,  Hall 6, 
Guest apartment: Hall 7.
Single-room large hostels: Hall 8, Hall 9, Hall 10.

Facilities 
 Rugby/baseball/soccer field
 Tennis court
 Basketball/skateboarding court
 Student/staff/guest Parkings
 Swan house

Controversies

Staff redundancies 

On 24 May 2013, the Manawatu Standard broke an article detailing the difficulties the reporter had getting information from the management staff as to the organisational restructure that was taking place. Sources, including previous and current employees, had revealed to the newspaper, under the condition of anonymity, that more than 10% of the work force had been "laid off, left or were "forced out" since the start of the year." Sources also revealed the extent of the institutions use of service as opposed to permanent employment contracts, and that "Management were reluctant to be upfront about the restructure because of cultural differences and the need to "save face."

President Wayne Edwards responded to the article more than a month and half later in an interview with the reporter, stating that privacy concerns had prompted the College's extended silence on the issue.

References

External links
Institute of the Pacific United's website
International Pacific University: International Pacific College's Sister University website

Universities and colleges in New Zealand
Education in Palmerston North